Autonomous telepresence is a method of offering remote healthcare in a patient's home using robots and videoconferencing systems to provide a consumer-based mobile platform. At present the existing systems have little or no autonomy and rely on remote operators.

References

See also 
 Telepresence
 Open-source robotics

References
Sparky Jr. Project
Hybridity

Telepresence
Computer-mediated communication